Charles Elliott may refer to:

Charles Elliott (New Zealand politician) (1811–1876), New Zealand politician
Charles Elliott (Australian politician) (1870–1938), member of the Western Australian Legislative Council
Sir Charles Alfred Elliott (1835–1911), Lieutenant Governor of Bengal
Charles B. Elliott (1861–1935), American jurist
Charles Loring Elliott (1812–1868), American portrait painter
Charles Elliott (footballer) (1896–1940), English footballer
Charles W. Elliott, British Columbia First Nations woodcarver
C. Thomas Elliott (born 1939), physicist
Charles Boileau Elliott (1803–1875), English cleric and travel writer
Charles Irving Elliott (1892–1972), pioneer aviator in the Hawaiian Islands

See also 
Charles Eliot (disambiguation)
Charles Elliot (1801–1875), British colonial administrator
Charles Elliot (1818–1895), British admiral